Wings is the ninth studio album by American country pop singer Michael Johnson. It was released in 1986 via RCA Records. The album includes the singles "Gotta Learn to Love Without You", "Give Me Wings", The Moon Is Still Over Her Shoulder" and "Ponies".

Track listing

Chart performance

References

1986 albums
Michael Johnson (singer) albums
Albums produced by Brent Maher
RCA Records albums